The Fengle Sculpture Park is an urban park in Nantun District, Taichung, Taiwan.

History
The park was opened in 1994.

Architecture
The park spans over an area of 6 hectares. It features the 52 outdoor sculpture works.

Transportation
The park is accessible within walking distance north of Daqing Station of Taiwan Railways.

See also
 List of parks in Taiwan

References

1994 establishments in Taiwan
Parks established in 1994
Parks in Taichung